Fernando Augusto do Amaral Caiado (2 March 1925 – 12 November 2006) was a Portuguese footballer and manager, who played for Boavista and Benfica as midfielder.

Playing honours
Benfica
 Primeira Divisão: 1954–55, 1956–57
 Taça de Portugal: 1952–53, 1954–55, 1956–57

International career
Caiado gained 16 caps for the Portugal national team. He made his debut 16 June 1946 in Lisbon, in a 3–1 win against Republic of Ireland.

References

External links
 

1925 births
2006 deaths
Sportspeople from Matosinhos
Association football midfielders
Segunda Divisão players
Boavista F.C. players
S.L. Benfica footballers
Portugal international footballers
Portuguese footballers
Primeira Liga players
S.L. Benfica managers
S.C. Braga managers
Sporting CP managers
Vitória S.C. managers
Boavista F.C. managers
Portuguese football managers